Ian Gary Cox CM (born 25 March 1971) is a Trinidad and Tobago former professional footballer. Cox was most recently joint manager at Whitstable Town, a post he took up in November 2015. He was part of the Trinidad and Tobago national team's squad at the 2006 FIFA World Cup.

Playing career
Born in Croydon, England, Cox joined Crystal Palace from non-League side Carshalton Athletic for a fee of £40,000 in 1994. Opportunities were limited and he eventually joined AFC Bournemouth on a free transfer in 1996 having made just a handful of appearances for Crystal Palace. At Palace he scored his first professional goal in an FA Cup defeat to Port Vale in January 1996.

He enjoyed a hugely successful spell at Bournemouth where he played alongside Rio Ferdinand, his no-nonsense playing style endeared himself to the fans in a playing spell that included over 170 league appearances. In the 2000–01 season, Cox joined Burnley for £500,000. He notched up over 100 appearances for the Championship side scoring five goals, before joining Gillingham on a free transfer, in the 2003–04 season.

Predominantly a central defender, Cox can also play in midfield. He was named in the Trinidad and Tobago squad for the 2006 FIFA World Cup and was on the bench against Sweden, England and Paraguay in Trinidad and Tobago's first ever games in a World Cup. Cox retired from international football immediately after Trinidad's elimination from the tournament.

On 28 March 2008, Cox was released by Gillingham and signed for Isthmian League Premier Division side and local rivals Maidstone United. Up until the turn of the year Cox was a permanent fixture in Maidstone's starting XI, playing a big part in what was one of the best defences in the league. However, in January 2009, Cox's work as a prison officer meant he could no longer commit himself to the club. He did not appear for the Stones in over four months, however he did return in April 2009 to make three more appearances before retiring from football at the end of the season.  In August 2013, however, he came out of retirement to play for Whitstable Town, managed by former teammate Nicky Southall.

Coaching career
In June 2015, Cox joined Isthmian League Division One South side Ramsgate as a coach and in November moved to Whitstable Town as joint manager with Wayne Wilson.

Awards
As a member of the Trinidad and Tobago squad that competed at the 2006 FIFA World Cup in Germany, Cox was awarded the Chaconia Medal (Gold Class), the second highest state decoration of Trinidad and Tobago.

References

External links

Ian Cox Stats at neilbrown.com

1971 births
Living people
Citizens of Trinidad and Tobago through descent
Trinidad and Tobago footballers
Trinidad and Tobago international footballers
Carshalton Athletic F.C. players
Crystal Palace F.C. players
AFC Bournemouth players
Burnley F.C. players
Maidstone United F.C. players
Gillingham F.C. players
Whitstable Town F.C. players
2000 CONCACAF Gold Cup players
2006 FIFA World Cup players
Footballers from Croydon
English sportspeople of Trinidad and Tobago descent
Premier League players
English Football League players
British prison officers
Recipients of the Chaconia Medal
Association football defenders